Iona is a city in Bonneville County, Idaho, United States. It is part of the Idaho Falls, Idaho Metropolitan Statistical Area. The population was 1,803 at the 2010 census.

History
Iona was homesteaded by Mormon pioneers in 1883. Sagebrush, as tall as a man sitting on a horse, covered the now famous potato fields. The short growing season made it difficult to grow crops and the early settlers were discouraged and many wanted to go back south to Utah. However, when Mormon apostle Wilford Woodruff spoke to a small congregation in the Iona area on June 17, 1884, he said:
The Spirit of the Lord rests mightily upon me and I feel to bless you in the name of Jesus Christ. I promise you that the climate will be moderated for your good. I can see these great sagebrush prairies, as far as the eye can reach, turned into fertile fields. I bless the land that it shall yield forth in its strength. Flowers and trees and fine homes shall grace this great valley from one end to the other. Schools and colleges of higher learning shall be built to serve you that you may learn the mysteries of God’s great universe. I see churches and meetinghouses dotting the landscape, where the God of Israel may be worshiped in spirit and in truth. Yes, and as I look into the future of this great valley I can see temples—I can see beautiful temples erected to the name of the living God where holy labors may be carried on in his name through generations to come.

The settlers were persuaded to stay in the valley and one, Thomas E. Ricks, went on to found the city of Rexburg and Ricks College which later became Brigham Young University-Idaho.

Geography
Iona is located at  (43.526319, -111.928478).

Demographics

2010 census
As of the census of 2010, there were 1,803 people, 578 households, and 481 families residing in the city. The racial makeup of the city was 97.7% White, 0.2% African American, 0.3% Native American, 0.1% Asian, 0.7% from other races, and 1.1% from two or more races. Hispanic or Latino of any race were 3.9% of the population.

There were 578 households, of which 45.7% had children under the age of 18 living with them, 72.7% were married couples living together, 6.2% had a female householder with no husband present, 4.3% had a male householder with no wife present, and 16.8% were non-families. 14.0% of all households were made up of individuals, and 5.9% had someone living alone who was 65 years of age or older. The average household size was 3.12 and the average family size was 3.44.

The median age in the city was 31.5 years. 35.1% of residents were under the age of 18; 6.6% were between the ages of 18 and 24; 25.8% were from 25 to 44; 21.1% were from 45 to 64; and 11.5% were 65 years of age or older. The gender makeup of the city was 49.1% male and 50.9% female.

2000 census
As of the census of 2000, there were 1,201 people, 372 households, and 318 families residing in the city. The racial makeup of the city was 98.42% White, 0.08% African American, 0.17% Native American, 0.08% Asian, 0.83% from other races, and 0.42% from two or more races. Hispanic or Latino of any race were 2.91% of the population.

There were 372 households, out of which 44.6% had children under the age of 18 living with them, 76.3% were married couples living together, 5.9% had a female householder with no husband present, and 14.5% were non-families. 12.4% of all households were made up of individuals, and 5.4% had someone living alone who was 65 years of age or older.  The average household size was 3.23 and the average family size was 3.55.

In the city, the population was spread out, with 35.6% under the age of 18, 7.2% from 18 to 24, 24.5% from 25 to 44, 21.2% from 45 to 64, and 11.6% who were 65 years of age or older.  The median age was 33 years. For every 100 females, there were 100.5 males.  For every 100 females age 18 and over, there were 98.5 males.

The median income for a household in the city was $39,904, and the median income for a family was $42,692. Males had a median income of $32,105 versus $21,818 for females. The per capita income for the city was $14,334.  17.6% of the population and 14.0% of families were below the poverty line.   11.6% of those under the age of 18 and 6.1% of those 65 and older were living below the poverty line.

Education
Iona is served by the Bonneville Joint School District#93, with Iona Elementary School within the Iona city limits. Students are bussed to Rocky Mountain Middle School and Thunder Ridge High School.

References

Cities in Bonneville County, Idaho
Cities in Idaho
Cities in Idaho Falls metropolitan area
Populated places established in 1884
1884 establishments in Idaho Territory